Kjos, Kjøs or Kjós may refer to:

 Kjos or Kjøs, Norwegian surname
 Kjos (Kristiansand), Norway
 Kjós or Kjósarhreppur, Icelandic municipality

See also
 Kjose